The Sexual Offences (Amendment) Act 2000 (c.44) is an Act of the Parliament of the United Kingdom.  It changed the age of consent for male homosexual sexual activities (including anal sex) from 18 (or for some activities, 21) to that for heterosexual and lesbian sexual activities at 16, or 17 in Northern Ireland.  It also introduced the new offence of 'having sexual intercourse or engaging in any other sexual activity with a person under 18 if in a position of trust in relation to that person'.

Lowering the homosexual age of consent had last been addressed by Parliament in 1994, when the then Conservative MP Edwina Currie proposed an amendment to the Criminal Justice and Public Order Bill to lower the age of consent to sixteen years.  Even though over forty Tory MPs joined Currie, the measure was lost by twenty-seven votes. Immediately afterwards, MPs agreed on division (427 to 162) to reduce the age of consent for homosexual sexual activities to eighteen. The election of a Labour Government in 1997 afforded Parliament a further opportunity to examine the issue.

In 1996, the European Court of Human Rights heard Morris v. The United Kingdom and  Sutherland v. the United Kingdom, cases brought by Chris Morris and Euan Sutherland challenging the inequality inherent in divided ages of consent. The government stated its intention to legislate to negate the court cases, which were put on hold.

Ann Keen, a Labour MP, introduced an amendment to Crime and Disorder Bill in 1998, and this was carried on 22 June 1998 by a majority of 207 in the House of Commons.  The amendment was then removed by the House of Lords by a majority of 168. Not wishing to lose the whole bill, the government allowed the issue to be dropped.

Later in the year, the government reintroduced the measure in what eventually became this Act. MPs from all major parties were allowed to vote on it according to their conscience. The bill once again passed the House of Commons  by a majority of 183 on 25 January 1999, but was again blocked in the House of Lords after a concerted campaign by Conservative peer Baroness Young. The government once again re-introduced the measure, this time threatening to invoke the Parliament Acts 1911 and 1949.

After the bill once again sailed through the House of Commons before being rejected by the House of Lords, the government carried through its threat and on 30 November 2000, Speaker Michael Martin announced the passage of the Act. It received Royal Assent a few hours later.

This Act was effectively superseded in England and Wales by the Sexual Offences Act 2003 which repealed most of its provisions as they applied to England and Wales. The new Act which consolidated most previous sexual offences legislation maintained the decriminalisation that had been achieved in this Act.

This fact became significant in the wake of passage of the Hunting Act 2004 which was also passed using the Parliament Acts 1911 and 1949. The passage of that Act was challenged in the case of R (Jackson) v Attorney General on the basis that the Parliament Act 1949 itself had been unlawfully passed. If the latter point were true, then the Sexual Offences (Amendment) Act 2000 would also be invalid, though the point would be moot since the provisions had been consolidated in legislation not passed under the Parliament Acts. The challenge to the Hunting Act was ultimately unsuccessful.

See also

Sexual Offences Act
LGBT rights in the United Kingdom

References

External links
Explanatory notes to the Sexual Offences (Amendment) Bill 2000
Q and A: The age of consent (BBC News, 29 November 2000)
Commons Vote on amendment to Crime and Disorder Bill 1998
Sexual Offences from Stonewall, including briefings on the bills in 1998, 1999 and 2000
Why the Parliament Acts should not be used on the Sexual Offences (Amendment) Bill (Christian Institute, 2000)

United Kingdom Acts of Parliament 2000
Anti-discrimination law in the United Kingdom
LGBT law in the United Kingdom
Sex crimes in the United Kingdom
Sex offender registration
2000 in LGBT history
Acts of the Parliament of the United Kingdom passed under the Parliament Act
LGBT rights in the United Kingdom
LGBT rights in Northern Ireland